Doreen O'Connor (born 1950) is a Fijian international lawn bowler.

Bows career
O'Connor won the bronze medal in the fours at the 2011 Asia Pacific Bowls Championships in Melbourne. Two years later she won a second fours bronze at the 2003 Championships in Brisbane.

She was selected to represent Fiji at the 2014 Commonwealth Games, where she competed in the triples and fours events.

References

1950 births
Living people
Bowls players at the 2014 Commonwealth Games
Commonwealth Games competitors for Fiji
Fijian female bowls players